Bourke may refer to:

People
 Bourke (surname)

Buildings in Australia
 Bourke Court House, a heritage-listed courthouse in Bourke, Bourke Shire, New South Wales
 Bourke Place, a skyscraper in Melbourne, Victoria
 Bourke Post Office, a heritage-listed post office in Bourke, Bourke Shire, New South Wales
 Bourke Street Wesleyan Chapel, a heritage-listed chapel in Darlinghurst, Sydney, New South Wales, Australia

Places in Australia 
 Bourke County (disambiguation)
 Bourke Shire, local government area in the Orana region of New South Wales
 Bourke, New South Wales, a town in New South Wales
 Bourke Street, a street in Melbourne, Australia
 Little Bourke Street, a street in Victoria, Melbourne
 Division of Bourke, a former Australian (House of Representatives) electoral division in Victoria (1900-1949)
 Electoral district of Bourke, an electoral district of the Legislative Assembly in New South Wales (1880-1904)
 Bourke Isles, a group of islands and islets forming part of the Torres Strait Islands, Queensland
 Bourke's Luck Potholes, cylindrical potholes or giant's kettles in the Blyde River Canyon Nature Reserve, South Africa

Other 
 Bourke v. Beshear, a 2015 United States Supreme Court case on same-sex marriage
 Bourke Airport, an airport located north of Bourke, New South Wales, Australia
 Bourke Award, annual prize awarded by the Royal Society of Chemistry
 Bourke engine, two stroke engine developed by Russell Bourke
 Proclamation of Governor Bourke, document by Sir Richard Bourke in 1835
 Dooney & Bourke (founded 1975), American company specializing in fashion accessories

See also
 Bourke Street (disambiguation)
 Bourke Street, an 1886 painting by Australian artist Tom Roberts
 Bourke's parrot (Neopsephotus bourkii), of Australia
 
 Burke (disambiguation)
 Earl of Mayo, earldom created in the Peerage of Ireland
 Bourke baronets, baronetcy created in the Baronetage of Nova Scotia